"On the Independence of Ukraine" is a controversial poem by Joseph Brodsky written in the early 1990s, on the occasion of the 1991 Declaration of Independence of Ukraine and the subsequent dissolution of the Soviet Union.

In the poem, Brodsky, in angry and insulting words expressed his feelings about the breach between the Ukrainian and Russian peoples. He refers to Ukrainians as, among other things, khokhly (a Russian ethnic slur for Ukrainians) and Cossacks. In the poem's final lines, he states that independence-minded Ukrainians will, on their deathbed, abandon their love of poet Taras Shevchenko (considered the father of Ukrainian literature), and instead embrace poet Alexander Pushkin (considered the father of Russian literature):

With God, eagles, Cossacks, hetmans, and vertukhais!
Only when it's your turn to die, you scoundrels,
you'll be gasping, scratching the edge of the mattress,
for lines by Alexander, not Taras's lies.

The poem was never officially published. Brodsky himself is known to have read the poem in public only a few times, including at the Palo Alto Jewish community center on October 30, 1992. Known only from private manuscripts, it began to receive publicity after it was published in 1994 by Ukrainian nationalists as a demonstration of Brodsky's Russian nationalist views.

For quite some time, the authorship of the poem was disputed due to striking differences in style, e.g., by human rights activist Alexander Daniel. However, in 2015, a video of Brodsky's 1992 public reading of the poem was posted on Facebook by a user named Boris Vladimirsky. This constituted sufficient proof for Daniel and others that the poem was indeed Brodsky's.

References

Joseph Brodsky
Ukrainian declarations of independence
Russia–Ukraine relations
Anti-Ukrainian sentiment
Incitement to genocide